The 2017 LNB Pro A Leaders Cup season was the 21st edition of this tournament, the fourth since it was renamed as Leaders Cup. The event included the eight top teams from the first half of the 2016–17 Pro A regular season and was played in Disneyland Paris. AS Monaco Basket won its second consecutive title after beating ASVEL in the Final.

Bracket

Final

References

Leaders Cup
Leaders Cup